"On a Rope" is a song by the American punk rock band Rocket from the Crypt, released as the third single from their 1995 album Scream, Dracula, Scream! It was released as three separate CD singles by Elemental Records, which combined to form a single set containing three versions of "On a Rope", five cover songs, and a four-song session recorded with Mark Radcliffe at the BBC that was originally broadcast May 26, 1996. "On a Rope" was Rocket from the Crypt's highest-charting single, peaking at number 12 on the UK Singles Chart. A music video for the song received play on MTV and MTV Europe.

Track listing

Personnel
Speedo (John Reis) - guitar, lead vocals
ND (Andy Stamets) - guitar, backing vocals
Petey X (Pete Reichert) - bass, backing vocals
Apollo 9 (Paul O'Beirne) - saxophone, percussion, backing vocals
JC 2000 (Jason Crane) - trumpet, percussion, backing vocals
Atom (Adam Willard) - drums
Donnell Cameron - engineering, recording of "On a Rope"
Eddie Miller - assistant engineer of "On a Rope"
Andy Wallace - mixing of "On a Rope"
Geoff Harrington and Mark Arnold - recording and mixing of "Alone", "Who Needs You", "Alergic Reaction", "Transcendent Crankiness", and "You and I"
Pat Coope and Chris Lee - engineers of Mark Radcliffe session
Savage - art, design

Chart positions

References 

1995 songs
1996 singles
Rocket from the Crypt songs